Blue Blood is a documentary film that was released in UK cinemas in 2007 and showed on BBC2's Storyville in 2008.  The film follows the paths of five students from Oxford University as they try to win a place on the Oxford University Amateur Boxing Club Varsity squad. Those who do will face off against students from the University of Cambridge and earn the right to call themselves a "Blue".

Production
The film was shot and edited by the director Stevan Riley. The film was produced by Rafael Marmor and Stevan Riley. It premiered at the 2006 Tribeca Film Festival one year before it debuted in the UK.

Reception
The film was nominated for the Variety New Documentary Award and for Best Film in the 2008 Evening Standard Film Awards.  Director, Stevan Riley, was nominated for Best British Newcomer in the London Critics Circle Awards 2008.

Legal issues
The film's cover and DVD case used an image of the Oxford skyline taken by a former Oxford University student, where permission was  given only for posters and only with credit given, neither of which conditions were adhered to.

References

External links
 

Documentary films about boxing
2006 films
2006 documentary films
British boxing films
Films directed by Stevan Riley
Boxing in England
Films shot in Oxford
Films set in the University of Oxford
Sport at the University of Oxford
British sports documentary films
2000s British films